Carex kumaonensis is a tussock-forming perennial in the family Cyperaceae. It is native to parts of China.

See also
 List of Carex species

References

kumaonensis
Plants described in 1909
Taxa named by Georg Kükenthal
Flora of China